Retter is a surname. Notable people with the surname include:

Erich Retter (born 1925), German footballer
Hannah Retter (1839–1940), New Zealand midwife
Yolanda Retter (1947–2007), American lesbian librarian, archivist, scholar, and activist

See also
Ritter (surname)